HŠK Ilirija was a Croatian football club formed in Zagreb. The club was founded on August 28, 1909, owing its name to the Illyrian movement. Throughout its existence the club played a major role in lower-tier local competitions, before it merged with other local clubs Tipografija and Slavija into HŠK Zvonimir in 1941.

References

External links
Ilirija at Nogometni leksikon 

Sports teams in Zagreb
Defunct football clubs in Croatia
Association football clubs established in 1909
1909 establishments in Croatia
1941 disestablishments in Croatia